Yuki Ito may refer to:

, Japanese actor
, Japanese classical cellist
, Japanese ski jumper
, Japanese Grand Prix motorcycle racer